The Polish Superliga, also known as the PGNiG Superliga for sponsorship reasons, is the top men's handball league in Poland. The current champion is Vive Kielce, the most titled Polish handball club, maintaining its position at the top of the table continuously since 2012. It is currently a 14 teams league from September to May.

The competition was founded in 1956 under the name I Liga and changed its name to Ekstraklasa in 1998. Since 2010, it is named Superliga.

Champions
 The complete list of the Polish indoor handball champions since 1955:

Polish Handball Championship (1955 & 1956)

I Liga (1956–1998)

 Ekstraklasa (1998–2010) 

Superliga (2010–present)

Teams

 The following teams compete in the Superliga during the 2022–23 season:

Total titles won

EHF coefficients

The following data indicates Polish coefficient rankings between European handball leagues.

Country ranking
EHF League Ranking for 2022/23 season:

4.  (5)  Nemzeti Bajnokság I (94.17)
5.  (7)  Danish Handball League (87.33)
6.  (4)  Macedonian Handball Super League (86.00)
7.  (6)  Polish Superliga (80.67)
8.  (8)  Andebol 1 (79.67)

Club ranking
EHF Club Ranking as of 12 October 2022:

 5.  Vive Kielce (506)
 10.  Wisła Płock (407)
 42.  Azoty Puławy (119)
 70.  Górnik Zabrze (78)
 128.  MMTS Kwidzyn (35)

References

External links
 PGNiG Superliga website 
 Polish Handball Federation website 

Handball competitions in Poland
Poland
Sports leagues established in 1956
Professional sports leagues in Poland